HMS Urchin was a U-class destroyer of the British Royal Navy that saw service during the Second World War.

Service history

Second World War service
Urchin formed part of the British Pacific Fleet during the latter part of the War.

Post War service
Following service in the Second World War Urchin was held in reserve at Harwich, then Chatham Dockyard until 1952. Between 1952 and 1954 she was converted into a Type 15 fast anti-submarine frigate, by Barclay Curle, Glasgow.  Following this she was allocated the new pennant number F196. She re-commissioned on 3 June 1954 into the 3rd Training Squadron, based at Londonderry.

In 1956 she went back into reserve at Portsmouth Dockyard.  In 1957 she was refitted as a training frigate and re-commissioned for service with the Dartmouth Training Squadron.  She subsequently served off Iceland during the 'Cod wars' in 1959.

Decommissioning and disposal
Urchin was decommissioned in 1964 and placed on the Disposal List. Before sale for breaking-up her stern structure was removed and fitted to sister ship  during 1966. The hulk was later towed to Troon, where she arrived in August 1967 for demolition.

References

Publications
 History of HMS Urchin at naval-history.net
 
 
 
 
 

 

U and V-class destroyers of the Royal Navy
Ships built in Barrow-in-Furness
1943 ships
World War II destroyers of the United Kingdom
Cold War destroyers of the United Kingdom
Type 15 frigates
Cold War frigates of the United Kingdom